Douglas Gordon McGuigan (born 7 August 1970) is a Scottish-South African professional golfer. He has won eight times on the Sunshine Tour between 2003 and 2017.

McGuigan was born in Durban, and currently resides in Johannesburg. After winning three West Coast Tour events as an amateur, he turned professional in 1989. He first played on the Sunshine Tour in 1993. He has also played on the Canadian Tour.

McGuigan's father, Francis McGuigan, was an Alloa-born professional footballer who played for Falkirk, Blackpool and Durban United. Francis McGuigan stayed in South Africa permanently after the end of his career.

Amateur highlights
Three wins on West Coast Tour before 1989

Professional wins (8)

Sunshine Tour wins (8)

Sunshine Tour playoff record (1–1)

Playoff record
European Tour playoff record (0–1)

Results in major championships

CUT = missed the halfway cut
Note: McGuigan only played in The Open Championship.

External links

South African male golfers
Scottish male golfers
Sunshine Tour golfers
Sportspeople from Durban
Golfers from Johannesburg
White South African people
1970 births
Living people